Tamils maintained a good relationship with the Chinese, with evidence of trade relations going back to 2nd century BC.

History and Evidence 

The relationship between the Chinese and the Tamils is 3000 years old.  Trade and Cultural exchanges flourished during the reign of the Pallavas. In the 8th century, the Tang dynasty, forged a military alliance with Narasimhavarman II and made him the General of the South China to safeguard from the expanding Tibetan Empire. 

Kanchipuram was an ancient center of Buddhism and learning visited by the Chinese traveller Xuanzang, who recorded that there were Hindu temples and Buddhist Pagodas in the city and the city was the center of learning for Tamil, Prakrit, Pali, Sanskrit, Engineering, Medicine and Philosophy in all of South and Southeast Asia. Buddhist Monks Buddhabadra and Bodhidharma travelled from Tamizhagam to China and established the Shaolin Monastery to spread Zen Buddhism. This eventually led to the transfer of knowledge of Siddha and Kalaripayattu, thereby developing into Chinese martial arts form of Shaolin Kung Fu.

The relationship between the Chinese and the Cholas dates back to second century BC. According to ancient Chinese scholar Ban Gu, China sent an ambassador to the court of the Cholas. In his work the Book of Han (Ch'ien Han Shu), Ban Gu mentions seeing at the city of 'kuvangtche' many objects that were unknown to China at that time. Berend, an acoustics expert, annotates that the city named by Ban Gu is analogous with the ancient Chola city 'kanchi' (the present day city of Kancheepuram in Tamil nadu, India). This suggests that Kanchi may have been an important hub for trade between the Chola kingdom and China.

The medieval and later Cholas too maintained a healthy relationship with the Chinese. During the reigns of Rajendra Chola I and Kulothunga Chola I ( CE), commercial and political diplomats were sent to China. Cholas sent ambassadors to the Court of China and Merchants from Tamizhagam traded in Chinese goods. The Kaiyuan Temple is a shiva temple built by the Tamil traders in China.

Zheng He, a Chinese mariner, explorer, diplomat and  fleet admiral  of the Ming Dynasty visited Tamil Nadu and Eelam and left the Galle Trilingual Inscription, a stone tablet with an inscription in three languages, Chinese, Tamil and Persian, in Galle, Sri Lanka. The stone tablet, dated 15 February 1409, was installed by the Chinese admiral in Galle during his grand voyages. The text concerns offerings made by him and others to the Sri Pada Mountain in Sri Lanka. The Chinese inscription mentions offerings to Buddha, the Persian in Arabic script to Allah and the Tamil inscription mentions offering to Tenavarai Nayanar (Hindu god Vishnu).

Coins 

Arrays of ancient Chinese coins have been found at places considered to be the homeland of the Cholas (i.e. the present Thanjavur, Tiruvarur, Nagapattinam and Pudukkottai districts of Tamil Nadu, India), further confirming the existence of trade and commercial relationship between the Cholas and the Chinese.

References 

Bilateral relations of China
China–India relations